The Nairobi derby, commonly known as the Mashemeji derby, or Ingo-Dala derby, is the name of the local derby between two major association football teams in Nairobi: A.F.C. Leopards and Gor Mahia. It is the oldest rivalry in Kenyan football history. Fans of both A.F.C. Leopards and Gor Mahia (often referred to by their nicknames, Ingwe and K'Ogalo, respectively) recognize each other as arch-rivals. Gor Mahia has won the Kenyan Premier League a record 18 times, while A.F.C. Leopards have 12 league titles to their name as at 2019.

History
The two clubs have been bitter rivals since they first locked horns on 5 May 1968. In a match on 23 March 2012, Gor Mahia fans began to riot after midfielder Ali Abondo was given a red card following a dangerous tackle on Leopards' Amon Muchiri. Gor Mahia was banned by the Sports Stadia Management Board from using their facilities for the rest of the 2012 season (those being the Nyayo National Stadium and the Kasarani Stadium) as a result. This was also the reason for the postponing of their Round of 8 derby match in the 2012 KPL Top 8 Cup.

Before that, on Heroes' Day 2011, Leopards fans had caused abandonment of an FKL Cup quarter final by pelting linesmen with objects after Gor Mahia went ahead with a superbly worked goal from a Moses Odhiambo and Moses Otieno combination which saw the former head in a superbly taken free kick by the latter. Leopards were made to forfeit the game and controversially escaped further bans despite the 1-0 scoreline being allowed to stand. Gor Mahia went on to memorably lift the Cup beating Sofapaka at the Nairobi City Stadium six days later and earn a right to represent Kenya in the 2012 CAF Confederation Cup.

On 8 June 2014, the two teams faced off again in a Kenyan Premier League match at the Nyayo National Stadium. Having taken the lead in the 24th minute through Timonah Wanyonyi, Gor Mahia conceded the equaliser in the 35th minute when Charles Okwemba sent Jacob Keli through on goal, with Keli slotting home past keeper Jerim Onyango. A.F.C. Leopards had to wait until the second half to take the lead, when Okwemba was fouled by left back David Owino before heading the ball into the back of the net from an Abdallah Juma free kick. Bernard Wanyama sealed the victory for Ingwe in the 73rd minute, after chesting the ball down from an Okwemba lobbed through pass before hitting the cross bar and ending up in the back of the net. The defeat condemned Gor Mahia to their heaviest defeat that season until that point.

Fans and hooliganism
The Gor Mahia fanbase is predominantly Luo while that of AFC leopards is mostly Luhya, making the rivalry partly tribal despite the significant support of "neutrals" (other communities or nationalities) for both clubs. The passion of the fans during encounters between the teams add to the intensity of the derby matches.

Both teams have been involved in cases of hooliganism, but Gor Mahia fans are usually found on the wrong side of the law more often than their A.F.C. Leopards counterparts. After winning their 2013 FKF President's Cup semi-final against Sony Sugar, Gor Mahia fans began celebrating the win, with a huge number of them invading the pitch to attack Sony Sugar players. The incident resulted in Sony Sugar goalkeeper Wycliffe Kasaya being admitted to hospital. Only four days later, the fans attacked Sofapaka officials during a 2013 Kenyan Premier League match. They descended on the club's assistant coach Martin Ndagano and their medic Charles Omondi, forcing them out of the stadium, and making away with the latter's mobile phone in the process.

During a 2014 Kenyan Premier League match against Thika United, A.F.C. Leopards fans descended onto the pitch in the 85th minute in frustration at their side's failure to come back from a 1–0 deficit. The incident cost A.F.C. Leopards the game, as the KPL handed Thika United a 2–0 win and handed A.F.C. Leopards a fine of KSh.500,000/= to be paid by 20 June 2014.

Major honours

References

Football derbies in Kenya